The 1939 Cork Senior Football Championship was the 51st staging of the Cork Senior Football Championship since its establishment by the Cork County Board in 1887. The draw for the opening round fixtures took place on 7 February 1939. 

St. Nicholas' entered the championship as the defending champions, however, they were beaten by Beara in the semi-final.

On 12 November 1939, Clonakilty won the championship following a 0-07 to 0-05 defeat of Beara in the final at Skibbereen Town Park. This was their first championship title.

Results

First round

Second round

 University College Cork received a bye in this round.

Semi-finals

Final

Championship statistics

Miscellaneous

 Clonakilty win their first senior title having lost six for the last eight finals.
 The first round match between University College Cork and Kilmurry was abandoned seven minutes from full time after a dispute arose in the Kilmurry goalmouth and the spectators invaded the pitch. The match was subsequently awarded to UCC.
 The second round game between Dohenys and Beara was declared void and game awarded to Beara after an objection over the use of illegal player by Dohenys was upheld.

References

Cork Senior Football Championship